The Jon Finn Group is a rock band formed and led by the Boston guitarist Jon Finn. The band plays instrumental progressive rock, sounding like a mix between Dream Theater and Dixie Dregs with a blues approach.

The group consists of Finn on guitar, Joe Santerre on bass, Ross Ramsay on keyboards, and Larry Finn on drums; all of the members are teachers at the Berklee College of Music.

Discography 
 Don't Look So Serious (Legato Records, 1994)
 Wicked (SEP Records, 1998)
 "Bull in a China Shop" (SEP Records, 2011)

References
 JonFinn.com

American progressive rock groups
American instrumental musical groups